Group A of the 2008 Fed Cup Americas Zone Group II was one of four pools in the Americas Zone Group II of the 2008 Fed Cup. Four teams competed in a round robin competition, with each team proceeding to their respective sections of the play-offs: the top team played for advancement to Group I.

Chile vs. Panama

Cuba vs. Panama

Chile vs. Cuba

See also
Fed Cup structure

References

External links
 Fed Cup website

2008 Fed Cup Americas Zone